Pedro Lasch is a visual artist born in Mexico City, and based in the U.S. since 1994. He produces works of conceptual art, institutional critique, social practice, and site-specific art, as well as paintings, photographs, prints, and works in traditional media.

Background
Born in Mexico City, Lasch studied art at the Cooper Union with Dore Ashton, Hans Haacke, Day Gleeson, and Doug Ashford (Group Material), among others, and later completed an MFA in Fine Arts at Goldsmiths, University of London.

Lasch has been regularly involved with the New York art and politics collective 16 Beaver Group since 2000. He has been at Duke University since 2002, where he teaches art and art theory in the Department of Art, Art History, and Visual Studies, is graduate faculty for the MFA in Experimental and Documentary Arts, and was a fellow at the Franklin Humanities Institute.

Duke University
During these years at Duke, Lasch's work has developed in an intellectual environment that, among the List of Duke University people includes influential figures in critical theory such as Fredric Jameson, Katherine Hayles, and Mark Anthony Neal. His co-publications and direct artistic collaborations with colleagues there include projects with Esther Gabara, Walter Mignolo, Michael Hardt, Kristine Stiles, and Ariel Dorfman, as well as the staff of the Nasher Museum of Art, which opened to the public in 2005 in a new building designed by Rafael Viñoly.

Artwork
Lasch's work, like that of many other artists who make participatory art, actively engages with pedagogy. His art has intersected with the international immigrants’ movement, and the philosophies of critical pedagogy, radical democracy, and the coloniality of power. Between 1999 and 2004, Lasch created a series of simultaneously local and transnational social projects with immigrant and indigenous groups in Chiapas and Quintana Roo (Mexico), and Jackson Heights (Queens, New York). In collaboration with grassroots organizations like Asociación Tepeyac de New York and Mexicanos Unidos de Queens, Lasch founded and directed the experimental afterschool program Art, Story-Telling, and the Five Senses (El arte, el cuento y los cinco sentidos, in Spanish). This pedagogical work received consecutive years of support from artist Robert Motherwell’s Dedalus Foundation, and it included noted guest participants such as Ricardo Dominguez from Electronic Disturbance Theater. During the peak of the 2006 United States immigration reform protests, three of the projects begun in Queens (Naturalizations, LATINO/A AMERICA, and Tianguis Transnacional) were presented in Lasch’s first major solo exhibition at the Queens Museum of Art in New York. This show was named as the best of the year by Michael Rakowitz in the journal Artforum. The museum and its immediate neighborhoods have since become increasingly recognized for their rich and globally significant immigrant culture, featured in popular films like Maria Full of Grace, Salma Hayek’s hit TV-series Ugly Betty, and most recently, Tania Bruguera’s Creative Time IM International project.

Early work
Lasch’s productions from the early Queens period, as well as his work with 16 Beaver, have expanded over the years to engage a growing network of international grassroots and interdisciplinary collaborators. His projects with official art institutions include shows at Sean Kelly Gallery, Baltimore Museum of Art, Queens Museum of Art, Walker Art Center, MASS MoCA, Nasher Museum of Art, MoMA PS1 (U.S.A), Baltic Centre for Contemporary Art and The Royal College of Art (U.K.), Museo Nacional Centro de Arte Reina Sofía (Spain), Centro Nacional de las Artes (Mexico), Singapore Art Museum (Singapore), Gwangju Biennale (South Korea), as well as the AND AND AND platform of documenta 13 (Germany).

Other involvements
Lasch has also served on various public and private boards, including the North Carolina Arts Council (2007–2010), and he occasionally curates exhibitions of other artists’ work that complement his artistic production. Flesh & Metal, Bodies & Buildings: Works from Jonathan Hyman's Archive of 9/11 Vernacular Memorials, is a curatorial project by Lasch, related to his own 9/11 memorial painting series entitled Phantom Limbs, as well as his work with the organization of Twin Towers Go Global.

References

External links 
 Pedro Lasch
 16 Beaver Group
 AND AND AND

Political artists
Decolonial artists
American contemporary painters
Hispanic and Latino American artists
Living people
Duke University faculty
Year of birth missing (living people)
Artists from Mexico City
Cooper Union alumni
Alumni of Goldsmiths, University of London
Mexican emigrants to the United States
American male painters
20th-century American painters
21st-century American painters
21st-century male artists